Smashing!, released in 1996, is the third album by English pop group, Right Said Fred.

Track listing
"Everybody Loves Me"
"Brick by Brick"
"Big Time"
"Ruby Don't Take Your Love to Town"
"You Want Kissing"
"La Samba"
"Living on a Dream"
"'Til the Sun Goes Cold"
"Favorite Thrill"
"Mr. Bad Vibe"
"Radio"
"ABC"
"Place I Know (The Fairy Song)"

1996 albums
Right Said Fred albums